Malliyam Mangalam is a 1961 Indian Tamil-language film directed by S. Soundararajan. The film stars S. V. Subbaiah, S. V. Sahasranamam, S. N. Lakshmi and Pandari Bai. It is based on the play of the same name by B. S. Ramiah.

Plot 

The story tells about the trials and tribulations experienced by Mangalam, a woman from the village of Malliyam in Tamil Nadu.

Cast 
List adapted from the film's song book.

Male cast
S. V. Subbaiah - 
S. V. Sahasranamam - 
V. R. Rajagopal - 
K. Sarangapani - 
T. N. Sivathanu - 
A. Veerappan - 
A. K. Veerasamy - 
Jiddu - 

Female cast
S. N. Lakshmi 
Pandari Bai - 
Mynavathi - 
Devika - 
Katpagam - 
Shanthini - 
Susheela - 
Chandrika -

Production 
The film was produced by Malliyam Rajagopal under his own banner Tamizhnadu Talkies and was directed by S. Soundararajan. The story and dialogues were penned by B. S. Ramiah and was based on the play of same name. Cinematography was done by Masthan while the editing was carried out by V. P. Nataraja Mudaliyar. Rama Rao handled the Art direction and the choreography was done by V. Madhavan. The film was made at Citadel studios. The song book says this is the Silver jubilee release of Tamizhnadu Talkies. The play had previously been filmed in Telugu as Santhi Nivasam (1960).

Soundtrack 
Music was composed by T. A. Kalyanam together with M. K. Athmanathan who also penned some lyrics. Other lyrics were penned by Kuyilan and V. Seetharaman. The song "Avarinri Naanillai Penne" is a ragamalika in the ragas Sama (also written as Śyāmā), Suddha Sarang and Ananda bhairavi. The song Alli Vizhi Asaiya .. Oviyam Sirikkuthu was released on 78 RPM record only.

References

External links 
 

1960s Tamil-language films
Indian films based on plays
Films scored by T. A. Kalyanam